Redland is an unincorporated community located in Clackamas County, Oregon, United States. It is located six miles (9.7 km) east of Oregon City and four miles (6.4 km) south of Carver.

The community was named for the color of the soil there.

Redland post office was established in 1892 and closed in 1903.

Stanley Fafara, a child actor who was a semi-regular on the television sitcom, Leave It to Beaver, is interred at Redland Pioneer Cemetery.

References

Portland metropolitan area
Unincorporated communities in Clackamas County, Oregon
1892 establishments in Oregon
Populated places established in 1892
Unincorporated communities in Oregon